The second series of the Ojarumaru anime series aired from April 5 to November 26, 1999 on NHK for a total of 90 episodes.

The series' opening theme is "Utahito" (詠人) by Saburō Kitajima. The ending theme is "Purin de ojaru" (プリンでおじゃる Pudding) by Yuriko Fuchizaki, Rie Iwatsubo, and Hiroko Konishi.

The series was released on VHS by Nippon Crown across fifteen volumes, each containing 6 episodes, from July 23 to December 1, 1999. Nippon Crown later released the series on DVD across two compilation volumes, each containing 10 selected episodes, simultaneously on November 21, 2002. The first volume contains episodes 92, 99, 104, 106 through 109, 116, 120, and 121. The second volume contains episodes 123, 128, 146, 149, 151, 156, 161, 162, 168, and 169.

Episodes

References

External links
 Series 2 episode list

Ojarumaru episode lists